Kelly E. Fast is an American engineer who works in the Planetary Science Division at NASA Headquarters. She is involved with planetary defence activities across NASA. She is also involved with the Yearly Opportunities for Research in Planetary Defense and the NASA Infrared Telescope Facility

Early life and education 
Fast grew up in California. As a child, she could see the Griffith Observatory from her bedroom window. She had a telescope in her window, and spent her evenings exploring the skies above Los Angeles. Fast was an undergraduate student at the University of California, Los Angeles. She moved to the University of Maryland, College Park for graduate studies. Her doctoral research considered measurements of ozone in Martian atmospheres using ground-based telescopes.

Career 
Fast worked as a research astronomer at the Goddard Space Flight Center, where she developed high-resolution infrared instrumentation, such as the Heterodyne Instrument for Planetary Wind and Composition (HIPWAC). These systems were capable of characterizing planetary atmospheres. She specialized in the atmospheric chemistry of Mars and Titan. She was also interested in how the stratosphere of Jupiter was impacted by small body impacts. During this position she regularly visited the NASA Infrared Telescope Facility. She was eventually appointed to the working group for the IRTF. In 2003 the main belt asteroid 115434 was named Kellyfast in honour of her contributions to science.

Fast moved to the NASA Headquarters in 2011. She was bade in the planetary Science Division, where she was part of the Planetary Atmospheres program. She was also responsible for the MAVEN Mars orbiter. 

Fast is responsible for near Earth object observations in the Planetary Defense Coordination Office. In this capacity, she searches for near Earth asteroids and comets. She is involved with various planetary surveys, including Pan-STARRS and the Catalina Sky Survey. In 2021, she was part of the Double Asteroid Redirection Test (DART) mission, which looks to redirect potentially hazardous asteroids away from Earth.

Selected publications

Personal life 
Fast is a Ham radio operator. She played a small role in the film Asteroid Hunters.

References 

21st-century American engineers
University of California, Los Angeles alumni
Engineers from California

Living people

Year of birth missing (living people)
NASA people
University of Maryland, College Park alumni